The Kenyan ambassador in Washington, D. C. is the official representative of the Government in Nairobi to the Government of the United States.

List of representatives

Kenya–United States relations

References 

 
United States
Kenya